The term Uzazi refers to the dried fruit of the West African deciduous shrub Zanthoxylum gilletii, syn. Fagara tessmannii, a member of the  'prickly ash' Zanthoxylum genus. The name of the spice is derived from Igbo, a language in Nigeria, where the spice is grown and harvested on a commercial basis. Zanthoxylum gilletii is a close relative of the Sichuan pepper, and uzazi has a similar taste profile to the Asian spice. However, unlike Sichuan pepper where only the pericarp of the fruit is used, uzazi is used whole (both pericarp and seed). This may explain why uzazi has a spicier flavour and greater pungency than sichuan pepper. 

Even in West Africa this is a rare spice, and typically only five or six dried fruit are added to a dish.

Use in cuisine
The whole fruit is pounded to a powder in a mortar and pestle and are added to West African 'soups' (stews) as a flavouring. Typically these would be used in soups where few or no chillies are used so that the pungency of the spice comes through.

References
Celtnet Spice Guide  (accessed July 20 2007)

External links 
Recipe for West African 'Cassava Soup' incorporating Uzazi

African cuisine
Spices
Igbo words and phrases
Zanthoxylum